Before You Go is the debut studio album by American rapper and singer Blxst. It was released on April 22, 2022 via Evgle and Red Bull. The album debuted at number 90 on the US Billboard 200.

Background
In an interview with Billboard, Blxst explained the meaning of the album saying "Before You Go is basically a note to self, speaking on the transition I feel like I'm facing as an artist, as an executive. Mainly just leaving some things behind from my past, or taking some things with me."

Singles and promotion
On December 3, 2021, Blxst released the first single of the album titled "About You", with the music video being released on January 26, 2022, directed by Alfredo Flores. The second single was released on March 3 titled "Sometimes" featuring Zacari. On April 22, he released the music video for "Every Good Girl". On May 12, the music video for "Never Was Wrong" was released.

Critical reception
Before You Go received positive reviews upon release. Revolt said "Unfortunately, some R&B artists are hit the worst when it comes to a sophomore slump, yet Blxst has managed to completely avoid that and continue building on his sound. For some, Before You Go can feel like a 13-track, 32-minute extension of his 2020 debut, No Love Lost. And while it can be seen like that in some ways, it’s more so the establishment of Blxst as an artist. No Love Lost was the perfect introduction to the rising star’s sound and what he stood for, and Before You Go is the perfect follow-up that proves he’s here to stay." HipHopDX wrote about the album saying Blxst tapped "into a new level of creativity, an impressive feat given how polished his music already is. With all the early success he;s seen, the West Coast multi-hyphenate feels more excited than worried about the impact that Before You Go might have." Andy Kellman from Allmusic stated the album that "Blxst elevates his writing with a little more depth, detail, and subtle wordplay, and he keeps it straightforward, never pandering, whether examining himself or working through relationship matters in a conversational manner."

Track listing

Charts

References

2022 debut albums